The Gojan School of Business and Technology was established in 2005, 22 km from Chennai, Tamil Nadu, India.
The college is run by Gojan Educational Trust Chennai, and is  affiliated to Anna University.

The institution is located on a  campus,  5 km from Red hills on Red Hills – Tiruvellore Road.

References

External links
 

Business schools in Tamil Nadu
Engineering colleges in Chennai
Colleges affiliated to Anna University
Educational institutions established in 2005
2005 establishments in Tamil Nadu